Demotina is a genus of leaf beetles in the subfamily Eumolpinae. There are over 50 described species in Demotina. The genus is native to Asia, Australia and Oceania, though one species (Demotina modesta) is an adventive species in the southeastern United States in North America. Some species are known to be parthenogenetic.

Species
These species belong to the genus Demotina:

 Demotina albomaculata Tan, 1992
 Demotina albonotata Bryant, 1931
 Demotina alni Chûjô, 1956 g
 Demotina andrewesi Jacoby, 1904
 Demotina atra (Pic, 1923)
 Demotina aurosquama Chûjô, 1961
 Demotina australis (Weise, 1923)
 Demotina bicoloriceps Tan, 1992
 Demotina bifasciata Bryant, 1957
 Demotina bipunctata Jacoby, 1885
 Demotina bivittata Baly, 1867
 Demotina bowringii Baly, 1863
 Demotina ceylonensis Jacoby, 1887
 Demotina collaris Eroshkina, 1992
 Demotina costata Eroshkina, 1992
 Demotina cylindricollis Gressitt, 1957
 Demotina decorata Baly, 1874
 Demotina decoratella Chûjô, 1956 g
 Demotina difficilis Bryant, 1936
 Demotina dissimilis Bryant, 1931
 Demotina elegans Chûjô & Shirôzu, 1955 g
 Demotina evansi Bryant, 1931
 Demotina fasciata Baly, 1874
 Demotina fasciculata Baly, 1874
 Demotina flavicornis Tan & Zhou in Zhou & Tan, 1997
 Demotina flavipes Bryant, 1936
 Demotina fragilis Gressitt, 1957
 Demotina fulva Bryant, 1931
 Demotina gansuica Chen, 1940
 Demotina glochidiona Gressitt, 1957
 Demotina grisea Baly, 1867
 Demotina imasakai Isono, 1990
 Demotina inaequalis (Pic, 1927)
 Demotina incostata Takizawa, 1978 g
 Demotina inhirsuta (Pic, 1923)
 Demotina irregularis Bryant, 1957
 Demotina jansoni Baly, 1867
 Demotina javanensis Bryant, 1946
 Demotina lateralis Gahan, 1900
 Demotina lewisi Jacoby, 1887
 Demotina major Chûjô, 1958
 Demotina medvedevi Moseyko, 2005
 Demotina medvedeviana Moseyko, 2006
 Demotina metallica Bryant, 1957
 Demotina minuta Jacoby, 1908
 Demotina minutella Moseyko, 2005
 Demotina modesta Baly, 1874 i c g b
 Demotina montana Chûjô, 1956 g
 Demotina multinotata Pic, 1929
 Demotina murina Baly, 1867
 Demotina nodosa Bryant, 1957
 Demotina obscurata Bryant, 1931
 Demotina ornata Baly, 1867
 Demotina pallipes Bryant, 1957
 Demotina parvula Baly, 1867
 Demotina pauperata Baly, 1867
 Demotina piceonotata Pic, 1929
 Demotina postica Chen, 1935
 Demotina pseudoimasakai Park, 2013
 Demotina pubescens Gressitt, 1957
 Demotina pustulosa Chen, 1935
 Demotina quercicola Takizawa, 2017
 Demotina regularis Eroshkina, 1992
 Demotina rufonotata (Pic, 1924)
 Demotina rufopicea Baly, 1867
 Demotina rugicollis Baly, 1867
 Demotina rugosata Gressitt, 1957
 Demotina sapensis Romantsov & Moseyko, 2019
 Demotina sasakawai Nakane & Kimoto, 1959
 Demotina serriventris Isono, 1990 g
 Demotina silvatica Eroshkina, 1992
 Demotina squamosa Isono, 1990
 Demotina striata Bryant, 1957
 Demotina sumatrana Jacoby, 1896
 Demotina thei Chen, 1940
 Demotina thoracica Jacoby, 1887
 Demotina tuberosa Chen, 1935
 Demotina veitchi Bryant, 1931
 Demotina vernalis Isono, 1990
 Demotina vietnamica Eroshkina, 1992
 Demotina vitiensis Bryant, 1931
 Demotina wallacei Baly, 1867
 Demotina weisei Eroshkina, 1992

Synonyms:
 Demotina balyi Jacoby, 1889: moved to Hyperaxis
 Demotina minuta Eroshkina, 1992 (preoccupied by D. minuta Jacoby, 1908): renamed to Demotina minutella Moseyko, 2005
 Demotina nigrita Eroshkina, 1992: moved to Hyperaxis
 Demotina punctata Takizawa, 1978: synonym of Demotina montana Chûjô, 1956
 Demotina serraticollis Baly, 1867: moved to Pseudometaxis

Data sources: i = ITIS, c = Catalogue of Life, g = GBIF, b = Bugguide.net

References

Further reading

External links

 

Eumolpinae
Chrysomelidae genera
Beetles of Asia
Beetles of Australia
Beetles of Oceania
Beetles of North America
Taxa named by Joseph Sugar Baly
Articles created by Qbugbot